Sri Venkateswara College is a constituent college of the University of Delhi established in 1961 in New Delhi, India. It is managed by Tirumala Tirupati Devasthanams & UGC and awards degrees under the purview of the University of Delhi. The college offers courses both at the undergraduate level and the postgraduate level. Vocational courses and short-term add-on courses that serve as significant supplement to the academic profiles of the students are offered by the college. Admissions are done purely based on merit and as per the Delhi University norms. It is ranked 14th among colleges in India by NIRF, 2022. Subsequently, in 2021 Outlook has ranked it: 6th in the Humanities stream, 9th in the Science stream and 13th in Commerce stream.

History 
It was founded under the Tirumala Tirupati Devasthanams (TTD) Trust, as a result of the efforts of Durgabai Deshmukh, who was a member of the constituent assembly of India and founder of the Andhra Education Society in Delhi (1948). She approached K. L. Rao (Member of Parliament) and C. Anna Rao (CEO of TTD), after realising the acute shortage of a degree-level college in the city. The primary objective of the college was to cater to the education needs of students from South India.

Foundation 
The college started up in 1961 in a school building of the Andhra Education Society in Rouse Avenue (now Deen Dyal Uppadhyay Marg near ITO), New Delhi, with 271 students and 13 faculty members. The foundation stone of the present campus was laid on 20 August 1961 by Sarvepalli Radhakrishnan, former president of India (then vice-president). The college moved into its newly constructed campus at Dhaula Kuan, New Delhi, on 25 August 1971. In August 2010, the college celebrated its golden anniversary.

Evolution 
Sri Venkateswara College came into being through the vision of Durgabai Deshmukh, K. L. Rao and C. Anna Rao in 1961. Initially starting off as a BA pass college, it began by offering B.A. courses in Telugu, Tamil, Hindi and Sanskrit. Within few years of acquiring its new campus, and led by its principal V Krishnamoorthy, the college introduced honours courses in arts and science. In 1973 the University of Delhi recognised it as one of its constituent colleges, paving the way for future expansion. From its beginning with just language courses, the college now has academic departments in other disciplines: Economics, Mathematics and Statistics, English, Political Science, History, Botany, and Zoology. The Department of Chemistry which initially provided chemistry papers for other departments was permitted to conduct its own honours course in 1983. Honours courses in Physics (1993), Electronics (1987), and Biochemistry (1989) began. It is a fairly young college in comparison to others of the university which provide honours courses.

Infrastructure developments were undertaken starting from 2006 using fund accrued under CPE, Star College, OBC expansion fund, Golden Jubilee fund and TTD grants. The status of College with Potential for Excellence (UGC 2004) and Star College (DBT 2011) were awarded; CPE was withdrawn in 2011 because of lack of NAAC accreditation which is absent in all of Delhi colleges. Pass courses in BA, BSc, BCom, Life Science, Biological Science and Honours in Tamil and Telugu were discontinued in 2013.

Campus

Facilities

 Hostel: Since 2008, Sri Venkateswara College has an on-campus hostel consisting of two blocks, one each for boys and girls to accommodate 144 students.
 The Bioinformatics Center was established in 2006 to promote biology teaching through bioinformatics. It was funded initially by the Department of Biotechnology under the Biotechnology Information System (BTISnet) program. It is the first Bioinformatics Center established in the University of Delhi and North India for the benefit of undergraduate students.
 The college has facilities for sports. The cricket field in the college campus has host district level competitions. Modern and better lawn tennis and basketball facilities are under construction.
 An auditorium with a seating capacity of 800.
 A fully air-conditioned and well equipped state of the art audio-visual Seminar Hall with a seating capacity of 250 students
 The college has a well stocked library of over 1,20,000 books and is subscribed to over 75 journals and periodicals
 ICT Labs

Organisation and administration

Governance 
The college was established and is run by Tirumala Tirupati Devasthanams(TTD), a board which organizes the temple of Tirupati in Andhra Pradesh. Public involvement in the affairs of the college is through nomination of people from various walks of public life to its Governing Body as per provisions of statute 30(1)(c)(i) of Delhi University Act, 1922. Management of various activities of the college is supervised by the Principal through designated committees. Monitoring of the affairs of the college is done by its Governing Body, Academic Council & Executive Council of the University of Delhi.

The Governing Body of the college consist of the following:
 Ten members nominated by the Tirumala Tirupati Devasthanams(TTD), one amongst them elected as chairman and another as treasurer.
 The principal of the college (ex-officio) member-secretary.
 Two members from the university (for two years).
 Two members of the teaching staff by rotation according to seniority (for two years),

Principals 
 V Krishanamoorthy 1973-1991
 A Sankara Reddy 1994-2009.
 P Hemalatha Reddy 2009–2020
 Prof. C. Sheela Reddy (Principal) 18-01-2021- Onwards

Academics

Courses offered

Undergraduate courses 
 B.A. (Hons) Economics
 B.A. (Hons) English
 B.A. (Hons) Hindi
 B.A. (Hons) History
 B.A. (Hons) Political Science
 B.A. (Hons) Sanskrit
 B.A. (Hons) Sociology
 B.A. Programme
 B. Com. Programme
 B. Com. (Hons)
 B. Sc. Life Sciences
 B. Sc. (Hons) Bio-Chemistry
 B. Sc. (Hons) Botany
 B. Sc. (Hons) Chemistry
 B. Sc. (Hons) Electronics
 B. Sc. (Hons) Mathematics
 B. Sc. (Hons) Physics
 B. Sc. (Hons) Statistics
 B. Sc. (Hons) Zoology
 B. Sc. (Hons.) Biological Sciences

Post Graduate Courses 
 M.A. English
 M.A. Sanskrit
 M.A. History
 M.A./M.Sc Mathematics
 M.A./M.Sc Statistics
 M.Sc Chemistry
 M.Sc Physics
 M.Sc Zoology

Add-on courses 
 Certificate Programme in Bioinformatics & Computational Biology (only for students of the college)
 One Year Post-Graduate Diploma in Bio-Chemical & Molecular Technology
 One Year Postgraduate Certificate Course in Tourism and Travel Management
 One Year Certificate Course in German Language (Part-Time)
 One Year Diploma in German Language (Part-Time)
 One Year Advance Diploma in German Language (Part-Time)
 One Year Certificate Course in French Language (Part-time)
 One Year Certificate Course in Italian Language (Part-Time)
 One Year Certificate Course in Russian Language (Part-Time)
 One Year Certificate Course in Spanish Language (Part-Time)

Ranking
 
It is ranked 11th across India by National Institutional Ranking Framework in 2021.

India Today Rankings 2019 :
 9th Best College In India, 5th Best College In Delhi For Commerce
 10th Best College In India, 5th Best College In Delhi For Sciences
 19th Best College In India, 7th Best College In Delhi For Arts

Notable alumni
Jayant Chaudhary, Indian Politician, Rajya Sabha  MP
Gaurav Kapur, TV Host and Actor
Partha Pratim Bora, Indian Politician
Prashant Raj Sachdev, Model and actor
Raghu Ram, Television Star
Nishtha Dudeja, Model
Devineni Avinash, Indian Politician
Aditi Singh Sharma, Bollywood Singer
Mona Vasu, Television Actress
Sriti Jha, Television Actress
Rashi Bunny, Actress
Nishtha Dudeja, Model
Sachin Gupta (musician), Singer
Rishabh Pant, Indian Cricketer
Tania Sachdev, International Chess Grandmaster
Amit Luthra Golfer, Arjuna Award
Tejas Baroka, Indian Cricketer
Sonam Wangchuk, Indian Army Colonel, Maha Vir Chakra

Student life 
The college attracts a large number of students from all over the country. Outstation students generally reside at student-friendly accommodations in Satya Niketan, South Extension and Lajpat Nagar. Due to its strategic location in the south of the capital city, a sizable number of student is from south Delhi localities, Delhi Cantonment and Gurgaon.

Student elections are held as per the DUSU format every year.

NEXUS 

NEXUS, the annual inter-college cultural festival of Sri Venkateswara College, was founded in 1978. The three-day festival attracts students from all across the university. The USP of the festival are its professional shows, including the Rock Show and Celebrity Show. Apart from this it holds competitions in Dramatics, Dance, Music, Fine Arts, Literary etc. rock bands like Parikrama, Indian Ocean, Pentagram,  Advaita, Euphoria etc. and celebrities like Kailash Kher, Sunidhi Chauhan, KK, Mohit Chauhan, Vishal Dadlani, Armaan Malik, Jazzy B, Sukhwinder Singh, Shankar Mahadevan etc. have performed at the festival. The festival is organised by Fine Arts Association(FAA) in collaboration with the Students' Union.

There are additional programmes like Venkateswara Swamy's Kalyanam and other poojas for Swami are done on regular basis and the prasadam is shared with students. There is an idol of Venkateswara Swamy in the college campus, which is worshipped regularly.

The Economics Association of Sri Venkateswara College has an annual Academic - cum - Cultural Exchange Program with Universities from Sri Lanka and Bhutan, the first of its kind in the University of Delhi.

References

External links 

Universities and colleges in Delhi
Tirumala Tirupati Devasthanams
Educational institutions established in 1961
Delhi University
1961 establishments in Delhi